Kochel station is a railway station in the municipality of Kochel, in Bavaria, Germany. It is located on the Kochelsee line of Deutsche Bahn.

Services
 the following services stop at Kochel:

 RB: hourly service to München Hauptbahnhof.

References

External links
 
 Kochel layout 
 

Railway stations in Bavaria
Buildings and structures in Bad Tölz-Wolfratshausen